Komsomolsk is a rural locality (a selo) in the Pervomaysky District of Tomsk Oblast, Russia. It is located on the Chulym River.  

The population was 1,997 as of 1 January 2015.

Residents earn money in the summer by gathering Siberian cranberries in local forests and swamps.

Transport 

References 

Rural localities in Tomsk Oblast